The old First Methodist Episcopal Church, also known as First Methodist Episcopal Church, South, is a historic redbrick Southern Methodist church building located at 400 Broadway in Pueblo, Colorado. Designed by George W. Roe in the Romanesque Revival style of architecture, it was built in 1902. In 1939 it became the Trinity Methodist Church. Bought by the George F McCarthy Funeral Home in 1954, it is now the George McCarthy Historic Chapel and is used for funeral services.

On November 14, 1979, it was added to the National Register of Historic Places

It is a one-and-a-half-story stretcher bond brick building.

The church was organized in 1871 and had its first building, the Corona Chapel, built in 1877 at what is now 217 Midway.

References

Churches in Pueblo, Colorado
Methodist churches in Colorado
Churches on the National Register of Historic Places in Colorado
Churches completed in 1902
20th-century Methodist church buildings in the United States
Romanesque Revival church buildings in Colorado
National Register of Historic Places in Pueblo, Colorado